Jacobabad is a city situated in Pakistan.

Jacobabad may also refer to:

Jacobabad Air Base, an airbase in Pakistan
Jacobabad District, an administrative unit of Sindh, Pakistan
Jacobabad Junction railway station, a railway station in Pakistan
Jacobabad Taluka, a tehsil of Jacobabad District

See also